The Uttar Pradesh Heritage Arc is a triangulation network stretching from Agra to Lucknow and Varanasi in India, covering an area of approximately 700 km.

History
The idea was conceived by the Government of Uttar Pradesh under the leadership of then Chief Minister of Uttar Pradesh Akhilesh Yadav in 2014  to boost tourism in the state.

Berlin delegation, March 2015

The Minister for Tourism, Om Prakash Singh, led a delegation of senior officers to create awareness of Uttar Pradesh’s tourism-friendly policies and initiatives, and to conduct meetings with industry professionals.

Uttar Pradesh Travel Mart

The Uttar Pradesh Travel Mart 2015 was a government initiative that had UP Tourism as its face in coordination with Federation of Indian Chambers of Commerce & Industry (FICCI). The first edition held at Lucknow on 22–24 February looks at the promotion of strategic areas of tourism in a substantial way for the state. The motive behind the event has been to lay the ground for initial dialogue and interaction through B2B session wherein the foreign delegates gets to have on-hand experience of not only the destination product but also the subsidiaries, infra-structure, hotel industry, transport and other ancillary service providers.

References

Agra district
Lucknow district
Varanasi district
Tourist attractions in Uttar Pradesh